Klaw is a surname. Notable people with the surname include:

Irving Klaw (1910–1966), American businessman, photographer, and filmmaker
Marcus Klaw (1858–1936), American lawyer, theatrical producer, and theatre owner
Rick Klaw (born 1967), American editor, essayist, and bookseller, grandson of Irving Klaw